Ghosts of the Past may refer to:

Prince of Persia 2008, a video game.
Ghosts of the Past (The Killing), an episode of the television series The Killing
Ghosts of the Past (album), an album by the rock band Eskimo Joe